Norman Vaughan may refer to:
Norman D. Vaughan (1905–2005), American dogsled driver and explorer
Norman Vaughan (comedian) (1923–2002), British comedian